Jennifer Yvette Holliday (born October 19, 1960) is an American actress and singer. She started her career on Broadway in musicals such as  Dreamgirls (1981–83), Your Arms Too Short to Box with God (1980–1981) and later became a successful recording artist. She is best known for her debut single, the Dreamgirls number and rhythm-and-blues/pop hit, "And I Am Telling You I'm Not Going", for which she won a Grammy in 1983. She also won a 1982 Tony Award for Dreamgirls.

Career

Broadway actress
Holliday landed her first big role on Broadway in 1979 at age 18, the same day she auditioned for the Broadway production of Your Arms Too Short to Box with God. Her performance in that musical earned her a 1981 Drama Desk nomination. Her next role, which she began to act at age 21, was the role for which she became best known: the role of Effie Melody White in the Broadway musical Dreamgirls. Holliday originated the role of Effie and remained with the show for nearly four years after its December 20, 1981 opening. Her performance was widely acclaimed, particularly in her iconic rendition of the musical number that ends Act I, "And I Am Telling You I'm Not Going."

Among the acclaim was Holliday's sweep of awards in 1982, including the Tony Award for Best Leading Actress in a Musical, a Grammy Award for her recorded version of the song, and Drama Desk and Theater World awards for her acting performance. Holliday also performed in the touring company of Sing, Mahalia, Sing in 1985. In 1998, Holliday was featured on the album, My Favorite Broadway Ladies as one of "The Queens of Broadway."

Recording artist
Holliday's version of the song "And I Am Telling You I'm Not Going" made her a star on Broadway and catapulted her to national stardom. In 1982, a pop version of the song was released as a single. The song became successful, peaking at number one on the Billboard R&B chart, and number 22 on the Billboard Hot 100. She continued to have success as a recording artist through the rest of the decade. Her follow-up song, "I Am Love", became another hit in 1983. Holliday's later R&B hits included "Hard Time For Lovers" (1985), "No Frills Love" (1985), "I'm On Your Side" (1991) and "A Woman's Got the Power" (2000). "A Woman's Got the Power" charted at number 7 in summer of 1999. It re-charted the following year, peaking at number 1. She continued to appear on the charts throughout the 1990s, but never had the same level of success she had in the 1980s. Holliday was a featured vocalist on the number one single "I Want to Know What Love Is" by Foreigner in 1985. A number of her songs became hits on the US Dance charts as well. A dance version of "And I Am Telling You I'm Not Going" peaked at number 6 on the Hot Dance Music/Club Play chart in 2001.

Gospel singer
On October 30, 1986, Paul Simon hosted a Ken Ehrlich-produced "Gospel Session" originally televised as part of a series of "Cinemax Sessions" featuring Holliday, Luther Vandross, The Oak Ridge Boys, Andrae Crouch, The Edwin Hawkins Singers, and the Mighty Clouds of Joy. The show began with Holliday singing "His Eye Is On The Sparrow". Later, she returned to collaborate with Simon and Vandross on "Still Waters Run Deep," followed by an Aretha Franklin arrangement of "Bridge Over Troubled Water, "with the finale consisting of all the participants joining in "Gone at Last", followed by "Amazing Grace".

A reviewer wrote:

Holliday became popular with LGBT events and fundraisers, which she acknowledged on her gospel album On & On. Because of this, the Atlantic Entertainment Group's Director of Live Talent, Scott Sherman, produced and promoted many Jennifer Holliday events for several years, acting as both Holliday's de facto agent and as her road manager. Under Sherman's aegis, Holliday went on a series of special tours and promotions, one-night-only performances, LGBT pride appearances, and special fundraising events.

Health concerns and career renewal
In the 1990s, Holliday lost a substantial amount of weight and talked about her health struggles with depression during promotional interviews. Initially, the weight loss was attained strictly by diet. Eventually, in an effort to avoid regaining the weight, Holliday had gastric bypass surgery. After the initial weight loss, she released an LP and video titled I’m On Your Side. The video, unlike most videos, was recorded live. In 1995, Holliday released the gospel album On & On. In a March 2008 interview, she revealed that she was in the studio working on a new album, to be released later that year.

In April 2011, Holliday released a Christian CD titled Goodness and Mercy on her own Euphonic Records label. She produced it in conjunction and cooperation with the Rev. Raphael G. Warnock, later elected United States Senator from Georgia.

At the St. Louis Muny, Holliday reprised her role of Effie White in their production of Dreamgirls, running from July 16 to July 22, 2012. She has stated that she does not plan to return to the role again.

Television appearances
Apart from her career in the music industry and on the stage, Holliday has also made appearances on primetime television. In addition to appearances on Touched by an Angel and Hang Time, she had a half dozen appearances in a recurring guest star role on Ally McBeal, where she acted out the role of choir director Lisa Knowles, often singing popular ballads.

In 2001, Holliday opened Unforgiven by singing "America the Beautiful", which was the first WWE pay-per-view to be held after the September 11 terrorist attacks.

On June 26, 2007, Holliday made a surprise appearance at the BET Awards, singing "And I Am Telling You I'm Not Going" in a duet with Jennifer Hudson, who had played Effie White in the 2006 film adaptation of Dreamgirls, and won an Oscar for her performance. Holliday had not been offered a cameo role in the film and, feeling snubbed, had repeatedly expressed displeasure with the movie in the media. (Another original Dreamgirls cast member, Loretta Devine, did have a cameo in the film.)
More recently, it became possible to see Holliday in a YouTube video, singing a duet with Hudson. The two actresses-singers performed their live duet at a concert Hudson gave on April 16, 2009. The YouTube video has been viewed more than 1.3 million times as of July 2021.

On October 17, 2011, Holliday appeared on The Wendy Williams Show where, following a sit-down interview, Holliday performed "And I Am Telling You I'm Not Going" and received a standing ovation from the studio audience.

On May 23, 2012, Holliday performed "And I Am Telling You I'm Not Going" alongside American Idol finalist Jessica Sanchez during the American Idol Season 11 finale.

On October 2, 2018, Holliday surprised the seven year old viral singing sensation, Malea Emma Tjandrawidjaja on GMA Day, and they performed a duet of "And I Am Telling You I'm Not Going".

On July 30, 2020, Jennifer Holliday sang “Only What You Do for Christ Will Last” as well as "Take My Hand, Precious Lord" at the funeral of civil rights icon and congressman John Lewis at Ebenezer Baptist Church in Atlanta.

In 2022, Holliday competed in season seven of The Masked Singer as "Miss Teddy" of Team Cuddly. She was unmasked on April 13 alongside Duane Chapman as "Armadillo" of Team Good.

Personal life
Holliday has been married twice. In March 1991, just two months after she met keyboardist Billy Meadows in a nightclub where she was singing, they married. "He had a great sense of humor and he made me laugh all the time," Holliday says of her first husband. "I had been feeling bad for so long, I wanted to laugh." But in December 1991, just nine months later, they divorced; the marriage, according to Holliday, "ran out of steam." She explained of Meadows: "We just didn't know each other well enough."

Her second marriage, which began on March 21, 1993, and ended in 1994, was to Rev. Andre Woods, a minister in Detroit. Jet magazine covered the marriage in their April 19, 1993 issue. Though Woods was a charismatic Detroit preacher, she subsequently said that even so, he was a player who also ran through her money. Still, Holliday was devastated when, in 1994, that marriage, too, ended, just four months after her mother died of cancer. "It was like experiencing two deaths at the same time," she remembered. "The grief was overwhelming."

Holliday attended Texas Southern University.  She later received a Doctor of Music honoris causa from Berklee College of Music, Boston in 2000. In 2001 she was presenter for the tap dance show 21 Below at the Town Hall in New York, and also appeared in the Broadway Cares/Equity Fights AIDS' Nothing Like a Dame show at the St. James Theatre in 2002.

As of late February 2011, Holliday was residing in Atlanta.

Health
Holliday suffers from clinical depression, and has spoken out about her struggle with the disorder. On her 30th birthday, Holliday attempted suicide by overdosing on pills; in an interview with CBS, Holliday stated: "I actually thought my life was over anyway, because I basically had gotten so big; I was well over 330 pounds. I had no record company, I had lost everything, struggling so much, that I was just, you know, I was like, 'I don't think that there's any need to stay here.'"

Holliday has multiple sclerosis.

Discography

Studio albums

Compilation albums

Singles

Theatre credits 

Additional credits
Sing, Mahalia, Sing (1985)
The Gospel Truth (1986)
Harlem Suite (1988)
Angela Lansbury: A Celebration (1996) (benefit concert)
Downhearted Blues: The Life and Music of Bessie Smith (2001) 
Black Nativity (2002)

Awards and nominations

Grammy Awards
The Grammy Awards are awarded annually by the National Academy of Recording Arts and Sciences. Holliday has received two awards out of four nominations.

Awards
 1982 Theatre Awards Outstanding Broadway Debut – Dreamgirls
 1982 Tony Award for Best Lead Actress in a Musical – Dreamgirls
 1982 Drama Desk Award for Outstanding Actress in a Musical – Dreamgirls
Nominations
 1981 Drama Desk Award for Outstanding Featured Actress in a Musical – Your Arms Too Short to Box with God

See also
List of number-one dance hits (United States)
List of artists who reached number one on the US Dance chart

References

External links

1960 births
Living people
20th-century American actresses
20th-century American singers
20th-century American women singers
21st-century American actresses
21st-century American singers
21st-century American women singers
African-American actresses
20th-century African-American women singers
American house musicians
American women pop singers
American soul singers
American gospel singers
American musical theatre actresses
American voice actresses
Drama Desk Award winners
Grammy Award winners
Theatre World Award winners
Tony Award winners
People from Walker County, Texas
Actresses from Houston
Singers from Texas
Ballad musicians
21st-century African-American women singers
People with multiple sclerosis